The New Pope is a drama television series created and directed by Paolo Sorrentino for Sky Atlantic, HBO and Canal+. It is a continuation of the 2016 series The Young Pope, originally announced as its second season. The nine-episode series stars Jude Law, reprising his role as Pope Pius XIII, and John Malkovich as Pope John Paul III, the titular new pope. It was co-produced by European production companies The Apartment, Wildside, Haut et Court TV and Mediapro.

The series premiered on 10 January 2020 on Sky Atlantic in Italy.

Cast

Main
 Jude Law as Pope Pius XIII (born Lenny Belardo), the comatose pope
 John Malkovich as Pope John Paul III (born Sir John Brannox), the titular new pope
 Silvio Orlando as Cardinal Angelo Voiello, Camerlengo and Cardinal Secretary of State / Cardinal Hernández, an opponent to Voiello during the conclave
 Cécile de France as Sofia Dubois, in charge of marketing for the Holy See
 Javier Cámara as Cardinal Bernardo Gutiérrez, the advisor of the Holy See
 Ludivine Sagnier as Ester Aubry, former wife of a member of the Pontifical Swiss Guard
 Maurizio Lombardi as Cardinal Mario Assente
 Marcello Romolo as Pope Francis II (born Tommaso Viglietti), the first pope elected during Pius XIII's coma
 Mark Ivanir as Bauer, the Ambassador of the United States to the Holy See
 Henry Goodman as Danny, Sir John Brannox's butler
 Massimo Ghini as Cardinal Spalletta, the Pope's personal secretary
 Ulrich Thomsen as Doctor Helmer Lindegard

Recurring
 Ramón García (Ramón García Monteagudo) as Cardinal Aguirre
 Antonio Petrocelli as Monsignor Luigi Cavallo, Cardinal Voiello's right-hand man
 Kiruna Stamell as the Abbess of the Monastery of Saint Therese, the head of the cloister nuns
 Nora Waldstätten as Sister Lisette, a cloister nun whose mother is ill
 Jessica Piccolo Valerani as Sister Pamela, a nun nursing comatose Pope Pius XIII in Venice
 Kika Georgiou as the Woman in Red, the head of a constant vigil over comatose Pope Pius XIII in Venice
 Nadie Kammallaweera as Sister Suree, a nun serving the pope in the Vatican
 Unknown actor as Girolamo Matera, Voiello's best friend who has a severe disability
 Massimo Cagnina as Don Mario, a priest who hosts Esther at his church
 Eco Andriolo Ranzi as Sister Caterina, a young cloister nun who commits fornication with a refugee
 Agnieszka Jania as Sister Ivanka, a young cloister nun
 Zaki Bibawi Ayyad as Faisal, a refugee hiding in the Vatican Gardens who later commits fornication with Sister Caterina
 Tomas Arana as Tomas Altbruck, Sofia's husband
 Claudio Bigagli as Duilio Guicciardini, the Italian Minister of Economy and Finance
 Janet Henfrey as Lady Brannox, Sir John's mother
 Tim Barlow as Lord Brannox, Sir John's father
 Daria Baykalova as Amber, Bauer's girlfriend
 Alessandro Riceci as Fabiano, Esther's love interest
 Enea Barozzi as Attanasio, a young man with physical deformities
 Lore Stefanek as Attanasio's mother and a wealthy lawyer
 Alex Esola as Freddy Blakestone, a tennis player and Bernardo's lover
 Ignazio Oliva as Father Valente, one of the Pope's assistants
 Marcello Marziali as Don Mimmo, an old friend of Voiello's
 Giancarlo Fares as Franco, Girolamo's caregiver
 Daniel Vivian as Domen, the pope's butler
 J. David Hinze as Leopold Essence
 Yuliya Snigir as Ewa Novak, Helmer's wife

Flashbacks
 Charlie Potts and Joshua Smallwood as Adam Brannox, John's twin brother
 Callum Potts and Matthew Smallwood as young John Brannox
 Hella Stichlmair as young Lady Brannox, John's mother
 Jonas Crodack as young Lord Brannox, John's father

Guests
 Marilyn Manson as himself
 Sharon Stone as herself
 Mitchell Mullen as Emory Kitsworth, a journalist
 Houssem Benali as Ahmed, an acquaintance of Faisal's
 Alex Beviglia Zampetti as Don Antonio, a teacher at Ventotene's elementary school
 Bruce McGuire as General Parker

Episodes

Production
The New Pope production began in Italy in late 2018. Filming took place inside St. Peter's Basilica in Vatican City in November 2018. Some scenes were shot in Milan in January and February 2019. The production crew also filmed in Venice in January and April 2019. Most of the filming took place at Cinecittà, in Rome. The crew returned to Rome to film at the St. Peter's Square in March 2019. Additional scenes were shot in Abruzzo and on the river Piave. The opening sequence of the series with dancing nuns was filmed inside San Giorgio Monastery in Venice.

Release
The series had its world premiere on 1 September 2019 at the 76th Venice International Film Festival, where episodes 2 and 7 were screened out of competition. It debuted on television on 10 January 2020 on Sky Atlantic in Italy, on 12 January on Sky Atlantic in the UK and Ireland and on 13 January on HBO and Canal+.

Marketing
The official teaser for the series was released on 28 August 2019. The second teaser trailer premiered on 3 November 2019. The official full trailer was released on 10 December 2019.

Critical reception
The series received positive response from critics. On review aggregator website Rotten Tomatoes, the series holds an approval rating of 90% based on 49 reviews. The website's critical consensus reads, "Though its predecessor's shadow looms large, devout fans will still find much to like in The New Pope's exploration of power dynamics and sumptuous strangeness." On Metacritic it has a weighted average score of 63 out of 100, based on 12 critics, signifying "generally favorable reviews."

Notes

References

External links

2020s Italian television miniseries
2020 Italian television series debuts
2020 Italian television series endings
Canal+ original programming
English-language television shows
Films about fictional popes
HBO original programming
Sky Atlantic (Italy) television programmes
Television shows set in Vatican City